Stepanovka is a rural locality (a village) in Kosh-Yelginsky Selsoviet, Bizhbulyaksky District, Bashkortostan, Russia. The population was 35 as of 2010.

References 

Rural localities in Bizhbulyaksky District